Appolinaire Djingabeye (born 9 February 1993) is a Chadian professional football player. He has made four appearances for the Chad national football team.

See also
 List of Chad international footballers

References

External links
 

1993 births
Living people
Chadian footballers
Chad international footballers
Place of birth missing (living people)
Association football defenders
Association football midfielders